This page lists properties of several commonly used piezoelectric materials.

Piezoelectric materials (PMs) can be broadly classified as either crystalline, ceramic, or polymeric.  The most commonly produced piezoelectric ceramics are lead zirconate titanate (PZT), barium titanate, and lead titanate. Gallium nitride and zinc oxide can also be regarded as a ceramic due to their relatively wide band gaps. Semiconducting PMs offer features such as compatibility with integrated circuits and semiconductor devices. Inorganic ceramic PMs offer advantages over single crystals, including ease of fabrication into a variety of shapes and sizes not constrained crystallographic directions. Organic polymer PMs, such as PVDF, have low Young's modulus compared to inorganic PMs. Piezoelectric polymers (PVDF, 240 mV-m/N) possess higher piezoelectric stress constants (g33), an important parameter in sensors, than ceramics (PZT, 11 mV-m/N), which show that they can be better sensors than ceramics. Moreover, piezoelectric polymeric sensors and actuators, due to their processing flexibility, can be readily manufactured into large areas, and cut into a variety of shapes. In addition polymers also exhibit high strength, high impact resistance, low dielectric constant, low elastic stiffness, and low density, thereby a high voltage sensitivity which is a desirable characteristic along with low acoustic and mechanical impedance useful for medical and underwater applications.

Among PMs, PZT ceramics are popular as they have a high sensitivity, a high g33 value. They are however brittle. Furthermore, they show low Curie temperature, leading to constraints in terms of applications in harsh environmental conditions. However, promising is the integration of ceramic disks into industrial appliances moulded from plastic. This resulted in the development of PZT-polymer composites, and the feasible integration of functional PM composites on large scale, by simple thermal welding or by conforming processes. Several approaches towards lead-free ceramic PM have been reported, such as piezoelectric single crystals (langasite), and ferroelectric ceramics with a perovskite structure and bismuth layer-structured ferroelectrics (BLSF), which have been extensively researched. Also, several ferroelectrics with perovskite-structure (BaTiO3 [BT], (Bi1/2Na1/2) TiO3 [BNT], (Bi1/2K1/2) TiO3 [BKT], KNbO3 [KN], (K, Na) NbO3 [KNN]) have been investigated for their piezoelectric properties.

Key piezoelectric properties 

The following table lists the following properties for piezoelectric materials

 The piezoelectric coefficients (d33, d31, d15 etc.) measure the strain induced by an applied voltage (expressed as meters per volt). High dij coefficients indicate larger displacements which are needed for motoring transducer devices. The coefficient d33 measures deformation in the same direction (polarization axis) as the induced potential, whereas d31 describes the response when the force is applied perpendicular to the polarization axis. The d15 coefficient measures the response when the applied mechanical stress is due to shear deformation.
 Relative permittivity (εr) is the ratio between the absolute permittivity of the piezoelectric material, ε, and the vacuum permittivity, ε0.
 The electromechanical coupling factor k is an indicator of the effectiveness with which a piezoelectric material converts electrical energy into mechanical energy, or converts mechanical energy into electrical energy. The first subscript to k denotes the direction along which the electrodes are applied; the second denotes the direction along which the mechanical energy is applied, or developed.
 The mechanical quality factor Qm is an important high-power property of piezoelectric ceramics. It is the inverse of the mechanical loss tan ϕ.

Table

References 

Energy harvesting
Microelectronic and microelectromechanical systems
Piezoelectric materials